Bram Stoker's Dracula's Curse (also known simply as Dracula's Curse) is a 2006 horror film by The Asylum, written and directed by Leigh Scott. Despite featuring Bram Stoker's name in the title, the film is not directly based on any of his writings or a mockbuster to the 1992 film Bram Stoker's Dracula, but shares similarities to films such as Blade: Trinity, Dracula 2000, Underworld: Evolution and Van Helsing. The film also shares some similarities with the 1971 Hammer horror film Countess Dracula, which also features a Dracula-esque femme fatale in the lead role.

Plot 
The film takes place in an unidentified city (presumably New York City) in the modern day, and follows the characters of Rufus King (Thomas Downey) and Jacob Van Helsing (Rhett Giles), both of whom have been observing recent attacks made upon young teenagers in the city at night. Van Helsing correctly identifies that the attacks are being made by a group of vampires residing in the city. The vampires are led by a foreign seductress named Countess Bathory (Christina Rosenberg), who hopes to use the humans to feed her growing vampire clan and to eventually seize control of the city, while at the same time using her growing power to gain the powers of "the Master". Discovering Bathory's plan, Van Helsing and King begin to hunt down and destroy the vampires one by one, until they finally face the Countess herself and try to kill her once and for all, before her evil consumes the city and allows Dracula's curse to consume the human race.

Reception
Critical reaction to Dracula's Curse has been mixed to positive. Scott Foy of Dread Central wrote, "Bram Stoker's Dracula's Curse isn't a bad movie. If you're looking for a vampire film cut from the same cloth as Vampire: The Masquerade or the short-lived TV series Kindred: The Embraced then you'll probably dig Bram Stoker's Dracula's Curse, but you'll need to have a little patience." Patrick Luce of Monsters and Critics said, "Although at times some of the acting is a bit stiff and the special effects are a bit lacking, Bram Stoker's Dracula's Curse ... is still packed full of enough gun fights, sword fights and vampire action to deliver a 'popcorn' rollercoaster ride of a fun movie."

Trash City's review stated, "Though falling some way short of perfection, if you liked Hellsing (the anime) or Ultraviolet (the Brit-TV show), then this will probably still be of interest, and is entertaining as such. But if your tastes run more to the fast 'n' furious style of vampire cinema which Hollywood currently prefers, then it's likely less recommended." Horror DNA's review said, "[It's] the best movie The Asylum has to offer. ... Scott has crafted something slick in Bram Stoker's Dracula's Curse.  It is a perfect starting point for those wanting to delve into the low-budget world."

Cast 
 Thomas Downey as Rufus King
 Eliza Swenson as Gracie Johannsen
 Rhett Giles as Jacob Van Helsing
 Christina Rosenberg as Countess Bathory
 Jeff Denton as Rafe
 Amanda E. Barton as Darvulia
 Tom Nagel as Rick Tattinger
 Rebekah Kochan as Trixie McFly
 Sarah Hall as Sadie McPherson
 Derek Osedach as Jimmy "The Kid" D'Amico
 Chriss Anglin as Rich "Nebraska" Zulkowski
 Sarah Lieving as Alex Deveraux
 Griff Furst as Konstantinos
 Justin L. Jones as Vampire
 Marie Westbrook as Anastasia Ravenwood
 Marat Glazer as Ivan Iwazkiewicz
 Vaz Andreas as Tsorak
 Jennifer Lee Wiggins as Dorthea
 Vanessa Rooke as Katarina
 Noel Thurman as Denise
 Erica Roby as Christina Lockheart
 David Schick as Lord Treykahn
 Leigh Scott as The Old One
 Mia Moretti as Juditha
 Joanna Houghton as Helena
 Ella Holden as Abigail Johannsen
 Troy Thomas as Orlock
 Ruffy Landayan as Lau
 Monique La Barr as Erzsi
 Katayoun Dara as Lexy
 Kat Ochsner as Magdalena
 Crystal Napoles as Selene

References

External links 
Bram Stoker's Dracula's Curse at The Asylum

2006 films
2006 independent films
American supernatural horror films
The Asylum films
Direct-to-video horror films
Dracula films
2000s English-language films
American independent films
American serial killer films
Films directed by Leigh Scott
Cultural depictions of Elizabeth Báthory
2000s supernatural horror films
2006 horror films
2000s American films